Petras Petrovičius Griškevičius (19 July 1924 – 14 November 1987) was a Lithuanian communist party official in the Lithuanian SSR. He was the First Secretary of the Lithuanian Communist Party (de facto leader of Lithuania) from 1974 to his death.

Early life and military career
He was born on 19 July 1924 in the village of Kriaunos, in the Rokiškis district of the Republic of Lithuania. He began his career in 1941 as a collective farmer in the eastern part of Chelyabinsk Region. At the beginning of World War II, Griškevičius retreated into the Russian SFSR. During the war, he was a member of the 16th Rifle Division (1942–1943) and a Soviet partisan (1943–1944) in Rokiškis district.

Party career
After joining the communist party in 1945, he slowly rose through the ranks. He worked in press censorship (1950–1955) before moving to the Vilnius City Committee of the Communist Party of Lithuania. There he worked at the secretariat (1955–1964) and central committee (1964–1971), becoming the first secretary in 1971.

Leader of Soviet Lithuania
After the death of Antanas Sniečkus in 1974, Griškevičius succeeded him as the First Secretary of the Lithuanian Communist Party. He was also a delegate of the Supreme Soviet of the Lithuanian SSR (since 1965), delegate of the Supreme Soviet of the Soviet Union (since 1974), and member of the Central Committee of the Communist Party of the Soviet Union (since 1976). Griškevičius was described as a Brezhnevite, conservative and "mediocre apparatchik", who opposed perestroika and especially glasnost. He supported suppression of Lithuanian history and cultural heritage, replacing them with Soviet propaganda.

Personal life and death
He died in Vilnius on November 14, 1987, and was buried at the Antakalnis Cemetery.

Awards
Two Orders of Lenin, July 18, 1974; July 18, 1984
Order of the October Revolution, 25 August 1971
Order of the Patriotic War, 1st degree, May 10, 1965
Order of the Patriotic War II degree, March 11, 1985
Two Orders of the Red Banner of Labor, October 1, 1965; March 17, 1981
Order of the Badge of Honour, July 20, 1950
Medal "For Distinguished Labour", December 24, 1960
Medal "To a Partisan of the Patriotic War" I degree, September 14, 1944
other medals

References

1924 births
1987 deaths
People from Rokiškis District Municipality
Central Committee of the Communist Party of the Soviet Union members
First Secretaries of the Communist Party of Lithuania
Members of the Supreme Soviet of the Soviet Union
Recipients of the Order of Lenin
Recipients of the Order of the Red Banner of Labour
Soviet partisans

Burials at Antakalnis Cemetery